Faveria albilinea is a species of moth in the family Pyralidae. It was described by Joseph de Joannis in 1927. It is found in Mozambique.

References

Endemic fauna of Mozambique
Phycitini
Lepidoptera of Mozambique
Moths of Sub-Saharan Africa
Moths described in 1927